Roger Charles Wicks (born 19 April 1957) is an English former footballer who made 41 appearances in the Football League playing as a midfielder for Darlington. He also played non-league football for clubs including Netherfield and Newcastle Blue Star.

References

1957 births
Living people
Footballers from Warrington
English footballers
Association football midfielders
Kendal Town F.C. players
Darlington F.C. players
Newcastle Blue Star F.C. players
English Football League players